Men's handball at the 1998 Asian Games was held in Thammasat University, Bangkok from December 7 to December 16, 1998.

Results
All times are Indochina Time (UTC+07:00)

Preliminary round

Group A

Group B

Classification 5th–8th

Placement 7–8

Placement 5–6

Final round

Semifinals

Bronze medal match

Gold medal match

Final standing

References

Results
Results

Men